Canoeing competitions at the 2023 Pan American Games in Santiago, Chile are schedule to take place between October 27 and November 4, 2023 at the Aconcagua River in Los Andes (slalom) and Laguna Grande in San Pedro de la Paz (sprint).

A total of 16 events (ten in sprint and six in slalom) will be contested, two less than last edition of the games. Two events in canoe sprint (K−1 200, men and women) have been dropped. The men's C-2 and K-2 events will also now be contested over 500 meters, instead of 1000. 176 athletes (130 in sprint, and 46 in slalom) are scheduled to contest the events.

Qualification

A total of 176 canoe and kayak athletes will qualify to compete. 126 will qualify in sprint (63 per gender) + four winners from the 2021 Junior Pan American Games and 46 in canoe slalom (23 per gender). The host nation (Chile) is guaranteed a boat in each event in the sprint discipline and in slalom (except the extreme events), however it must compete in the respective qualification tournaments.

Medal summary

Medal table

Medalists

Slalom

Sprint
Men

Women

See also
Canoeing at the 2024 Summer Olympics

References

Canoeing at the 2023
Events at the 2023 Pan American Games
Pan American Games
2023